Şabanözü is a town in Çankırı Province, Turkey. It is the seat of Şabanözü District. Its population is 8,843 (2021). The town consists of 7 quarters: Cumhuriyet, Sağlık, Yeni, Mahmudiye, Gürpınar, Gümerdiğin and Karaören.

Economy
Every Monday is the day for bazaar (farmer's market) which takes place in the centrum. Wheat, beans, corn and various fruit are the agricultural products of the fields that are rich of natural water resources. Gümerdiğin is one of the biggest towns of the district.

Unemployment rate is zero in Şabanözü and it is the record for Turkey.

References

External links
 Municipality's official website 

 
Populated places in Çankırı Province
Şabanözü District